The Aguman ding Maldang Talapagobra (AMT) (Kapampangan, League of Poor Laborers or League of Poor Workers) was a trade union in Pampanga, Philippines, organized by Pedro Abad Santos in 1933. It was influenced by European socialism and anarchism, functioned as a mutual aid association, and participated in electoral politics.

The AMT was supported by the Partido Sosyalista ng Pilipinas (Socialist Party of the Philippines), a socialist party established by Abad Santos when the Partido Komunista ng Pilipinas (Communist Party of the Philippines) was outlawed in 1932. The AMT employed strike actions and mass demonstrations against landowners.

There were occasions during the 1930s when members of the AMT were found dead, having been killed by security personnel of the sugar centrals or private armies of landowners.

References

Trade unions established in 1933
Trade unions in the Philippines
Political repression in the Philippines